Herbert David Ross (May 13, 1927 – October 9, 2001) was an American actor, choreographer, director and producer who worked predominantly in theater and film. He was nominated for two Academy Awards and a Tony Award.

He is known for directing musical and comedies such as Goodbye, Mr. Chips (1969), The Owl and the Pussycat (1970), Play It Again, Sam (1972),  The Sunshine Boys, Funny Lady (both 1975), The Goodbye Girl (1977), California Suite (1978), and Pennies From Heaven (1981). His later films include Footloose (1984), and Steel Magnolias (1989). For the drama The Turning Point (1977) he received two Academy Award nominations for Best Picture and Best Director and received the Golden Globe Award for Best Director.

He is also known for his work on Broadway as a choreographer for productions for Barbra Streisand, Stephen Sondheim, Richard Rodgers, and Arthur Laurents. His credits include A Tree Grows in Brooklyn in 1951, Finian's Rainbow in 1960, I Can Get It for You Wholesale in 1962, and Do I Hear a Waltz? in 1965. He received a Tony Award for Best Choreography for Anyone Can Whistle in 1964.

Early life
Ross was born on May 13, 1927 in Brooklyn, New York, the son of Louis Chester Ross, a postal clerk, and his wife Martha (née Grundfast). His parents were Russian-Jewish immigrants. When Ross was nine, his mother died and his father moved the family to Miami and opened a luncheonette.

After dropping out of high school, Ross went to New York to pursue an acting career but became smitten with and studied dance.

Career

Theatre 
Dancer

In 1942, Ross' stage debut came as "Third Witch" in a touring company of Macbeth. The next year brought his first Broadway performance credits with Something for the Boys, as a dancer. Ross was a dancer in Follow the Girls (1943–44), Laffing Room Only (1944–45), Beggar's Holiday (1946–47), and Look, Ma, I'm Dancin'!.

Choreographer

By 1950, he was a choreographer with the American Ballet Theatre and choreographed his first Broadway production, the Arthur Schwartz-Dorothy Fields musical adaptation of A Tree Grows in Brooklyn (1951). For TV he choreographed All Star Revue, The Milton Berle Show, and The Steve Allen Plymouth Show. Ross's first film assignment came as an uncredited choreographer on Carmen Jones (1954).

Back on Broadway he choreographed House of Flowers (1954) for Peter Brook, and The Body Beautiful (1958). He choreographed some TV specials: The Jerry Lewis Show (1957), Wonderful Town (1958), Meet Me in St Louis (1959) and A Christmas Festival (1959). On Broadway Ross directed and choreographed a revival of Finian's Rainbow (1960). In 1965, Ross choreographed the original production of On a Clear Day, You Can See Forever and, without credit, took over the helm from the director of record, Robert Lewis, when the musical ran into trouble in Boston during its pre-Broadway tryout tour.

Ross went to England where he choreographed the feature film The Young Ones (1961), starring Cliff Richard. He returned to Broadway to be musical director on The Gay Life (1961–62) and I Can Get It for You Wholesale (1962), the latter directed by Arthur Laurents and starring Barbra Streisand. He did The Bacchantes (1961) for TV. Ross then choreographed a second Cliff Richard musical in England, Summer Holiday (1963). On Broadway he choreographed Tovarich (1963) with Vivien Leigh and Anyone Can Whistle (1964) with Laurents. For TV he did musical numbers for The Fantasticks (1964), The Bell Telephone Hour, Delia Scala Show (1962), Rinaldo in campo (1963), and The Nut House!! (1964) and staged numbers for the films Inside Daisy Clover (1965), Who's Afraid of Virginia Woolf? (1966) and Doctor Dolittle (1967).

On Broadway Ross directed and choreographed Kelly (1965), and choreographed Do I Hear a Waltz? (1965) and On a Clear Day You Can See Forever (1965-66). He did some additional staging on The Apple Tree (1966–67) directed by Mike Nichols. Ross was choreographer and director of musical numbers for Funny Girl (1968), produced by Ray Stark.

Film 
His film directorial debut came with the musical version of Goodbye, Mr. Chips (1969), made by MGM-British, with Peter O'Toole and Petula Clark. It was produced by Arthur P. Jacobs who had made Doctor Dolittle two years prior, and just like that film, Goodbye, Mr. Chips was a box-office disappointment. However, Ross' second feature as director, The Owl and the Pussycat (1970), was a big hit. The film was produced by Ray Stark and starred Streisand.

Ross did T.R. Baskin (1971) then Play It Again, Sam (1972), the latter produced by Jacobs and starring Woody Allen based on his play. Ross made The Last of Sheila (1973) co-written by Stephen Sondheim and Anthony Perkins, and Funny Lady (1975) with Stark and Streisand. Ross directed The Sunshine Boys (1975) based on a play and script by Neil Simon, starting a long collaboration between the two men; Stark produced. Ross directed The Seven-Per-Cent Solution (1976), and The Turning Point (1977); Ross produced the latter.

Ross had two big hits with Simon scripts produced by Stark, The Goodbye Girl (1977) and California Suite (1978). Ross returned to Broadway to direct Neil Simon's Chapter Two (1977–79). After doing the ballet film Nijinsky (1980) he directed Simon's I Ought to Be in Pictures (1980–81) on Broadway. He followed this with Pennies from Heaven (1981) and the film version of I Ought to Be in Pictures (1982). His last film with Simon was Max Dugan Returns (1983).

Later career
Ross had a huge hit with Footloose (1984). He followed this with two comedies, Protocol (1984) with Goldie Hawn and The Secret of My Success (1987) with Michael J. Fox. Less successful was Dancers (1987).

Ross had one last big hit with another play adaptation, Steel Magnolias (1989). In the 1990s, he directed My Blue Heaven (1990), True Colors (1991), Undercover Blues (1993) and Boys on the Side (1995).

Personal life
In 1959, he married Nora Kaye, a ballerina, with whom he produced four films. In 1987, his wife Nora died of cancer.

In September 1988, he married for the second time to Lee Radziwiłł, the younger sister of Jacqueline Kennedy Onassis. The marriage ended in divorce in 2001, shortly before his death. In 2013, Radziwiłł described their relationship as follows:

He was certainly different from anybody else I'd been involved with, and the film world sounded exciting. Well, it wasn't. I hated Hollywood, and the provincialism of the industry ... Herbert had been married to the ballerina Nora Kaye until she died, and unbeknownst to me was still obsessed by her. It was 'Nora said this, Nora did it like that, Nora liked brown and orange.'

On October 9, 2001, Ross died from heart failure in New York City. A memorial was held for him at the Majestic Theater on West 44th Street in New York where Leslie Browne, Barbara Cook, Arthur Laurents, Marsha Mason, Mike Nichols and Mary-Louise Parker spoke of Ross. He was interred with Kaye in the Westwood Village Memorial Park Cemetery in Los Angeles.

Works

Film

Television

Theatre

Awards and nominations

References

External links

1927 births
2001 deaths
American choreographers
American film producers
American people of Russian-Jewish descent
Best Director Golden Globe winners
Bouvier family
Film directors from New York City
Jewish American male actors
People from Brooklyn
David di Donatello winners
Burials at Westwood Village Memorial Park Cemetery
Comedy film directors